Areca nut production in India is dominant in the coastal region within  from the coast line, and also in some other non-coastal states of India. Areca nut (Areca catechu), a tropical crop, is popularly known as betel nut, as its common usage in the country is for mastication with betel leaves. It is a palm tree species under the family of Arecaceae. It has commercial and economic importance not only in India but also in China and  Southeast Asia.

Areca nut production in India is the largest in the world, as per the Food and Agriculture Organization of the United Nations (FAO) statistics for 2017, accounting for 54.07% of its world output, and is exported to many countries.  Within India, as of 2013–14, Karnataka produces 62.69% of the crop followed by Kerala and Assam; all three states together account for 88.59% of its production. In the other states of Meghalaya, Tamil Nadu, and West Bengal, where it is also consumed, the crop is  grown in a very small area. In Karnataka, in the Uttara Kannada District and Shivamogga District the crop is grown extensively

History

Areca nut is not a native crop of India. It is generally believed to be native to Malaysia or Philippines where it is grown in many varieties. It is a tropical crop which grows from West Indies to the East Coast of Africa, and in Bangladesh, China, Sri Lanka and Malaya. The practice of chewing the areca nuts is attributed to Vietnam and Malaysia. It was from Southeast Asia that the crop spread to Asia and India where it is cultivated as a cash crop. It is conjectured that ancient Indian literature provide information on betel nut and its mastication. The Indian Ayurveda texts also refer to the areca nuts as a traditional medicine.

Its use in India is also noted from the pre-vedic period and was described by the word taamboola in ancient Indian civilization. It is extensively used in  Hindu religious rites of birth, marriage, nuptial and is also offered to guests as a mark of hospitality. It is offered to gods in veneration in the form of taamboola, which consists of one areca nut placed over two betel leaves.

Areca nut is extensively used as a masticator in south and southeast Asian counties, chewed with or without betel leaves. However, in India it has a special ethno-religious importance.

Varieties
In India there are two varieties of areca nut, also called supari in Hindi language. One is the white variety and the other is the red variety. The white areca nut is produced by harvesting the fully ripe nuts and then subjecting it to sun drying for about 2 months. In the red variety the green areca nut is harvested, boiled and then its exterior husk is removed. Sometimes Arecanut is even grounded in the soil for fermentation purpose to enhance the taste preferably called as "Mojha Tamul" in Assam.

Production

The details of state wise area and production are given in the Table for ten states.

But its yield at higher elevations is not economical. During the process of drying of the whole fruits or processed nuts sunshine requirement varies from 7 to 45 days.

The plant grows in well drained, deep clay loamy soil; laterite, red loam and alluvial soils are considered most suitable. Areca nut farming, to achieve good yield, needs large application of organic manures and chemical fertilizers.

The gestation period for the areca nut tree to yield fruits varies from four to eight years. Its life span is up to 60 years and in some cases even 100 years. Pollination takes place due to the effect of wind. The tree bears small creamy white flowers which have a strong scent. The fruit grows to a ripening stage in about 8 months. The tree bears bunches of fruits which are plucked manually.

The type of diseases affecting the areca nut plant are: bud-rot, mahali (fruit-rot), yellow leaf disease, which need to be tackled by chemical spraying.

Irrigation is an essential requirement (once a week) along with the land drainage throughout the year. Irrigation water is drawn from rivers or wells using pump sets.

The chemical composition of areca nut comprises 14 to 15% of fat, polyphenols, tannins, alkaloids, polysaccharides, a small amount of protein, and vitamin B6 and vitamin C. The fat, which is extracted by using organic solvents, is made up of mastic acid and its byproducts. The fat is mixed in a certain proportion with cocoa butter or coconut oil, which is then used to make confectioneries and duplicate dairy products.

The polyphenol (tannins) content varies from 38 to 47% in tender nuts and 15 to 22% in ripe nuts. Tannin, which is extracted from the nut, is used in foods as natural colouring agent, and also in the leather industry. Other minor constituents in the areca nut alkaloids, in terms of the total weight of the nut, is about 1.6%, which are comprise arecoline, arecolodine, arecaidine, guvacine, isoguvacine, and govacolidine; the pharmacological and other uses of these alkaloids are as "antihelminithic, ophthalmic, antibacterial, antidiabetic." 

Areca nut husk is used to make many industrial products such as hardboard, insulation wool, cushions, paper, paper board and activated carbon. The chemical composition of the areca husk consists of 18.75% furaldehyde which when distilled produces 5.5% furfural; it also yields xylitol.

Areca leaf sheaths are used to make ply-boards. Other miscellaneous uses of leaf sheath are to make caps, eating bowls, vessels to keep palm wine, and artifacts. 

In the past, plantation farmers practiced inter-cropping to make themselves safe economically, as the gestation period of the areca nut plant before it started yielding nuts was very long. It was also subject to plant diseases and pests.  Natural disasters and inaccessible locations also added to the problem. However, with improvements in management practices, with better marketing facilities and good infrastructure and cooperatives, inter cropping is less practiced.

Areca nut cultivation is carried out according to farm management practices after studying different cost concepts. Costs include the value of hired human labour and hired and owned animal labour. As the nut is harvested five to six times in a year labour costs are high.

The fruit, which bears the nut, is orange coloured and is in the shape of an egg or oval shape; it holds a hard single seed.

Uses
Areca nut and the plant as a whole is used widely in India and South Asia as: a masticator for chewing purposes, vegetable, medicine, stimulant, timber, fuel wood, clothing, wrapping, lubricant, tannin and so forth. The nut is chewed with the betel leaf as it has a stimulating effect.

References

Bibliography
 
 
 

Crops
Agricultural production in India by commodity
Herbal and fungal stimulants
Indian culture
Medicinal plants of Asia